Serge Élie Ayoub (born 29 October 1964), also known under the alias Batskin, is a French political activist associated with the far-right and formerly the hooligan movement.

Biography 
Ayoub was born in Bagnolet. His French mother was a magistrate, his father, of Lebanese descent, was a civil servant. On a language study trip to England, he first learned about punk movement and became interested in neo-nazi skinheads.

He became associated with the hooligans of the Parc des Princes, supporters of Paris Saint-Germain, with the Pitbull Kop. He founded in 1987 the Jeunesses Nationalistes Révolutionnaires ("Revolutionary Nationalist Youth", also known by its initialism JNR) and joined the Pierre-and-Marie-Curie University. In 1993, he was a candidate during the 1993 French legislative election where he obtained 0.17% of the votes. He was associated with Alain Soral's movement, Égalité et Réconciliation, close to Frédéric Chatillon, member of Groupe Union Défense and founded a bar for conferences with Jean-Paul Gourévitch, Pierre Sidos, Pierre Hillard, François-Bernard Huyghe, Guillaume de Tanoüarn, Michel Drac, Romain Bessonnet, Jean-Marie Vianney Ndagijimana, Véronique Hervouët, David Mascré, Maurice Gendre, Denis Collin and Marine Le Pen. In 2013, he made several media appearances following the death of Clément Méric, an antifascist activist who died during a fight with skinheads. The decision to give Ayoub public visibility was criticized by then-Minister of Education Najat Vallaud-Belkacem.

Personal life 
In the 1990s, Ayoub was romantically involved with pornographic actress Tabatha Cash.

Publications 
 Conte barbare, 2008, Le Retour aux Sources,
 Doctrine du Solidarisme, 2012, Éditions du Pont d’Arcole

Bibliography 
 Éric Rossi, Jeunesse française des années 80–90 : la tentation néo-fasciste, sous la dir. et préf. d'Hugues Portelli, Librairie générale de droit et de jurisprudence, 1995, 382 p.

Filmography
 Sur les pavés, autonomiste media, 2009.

See also 
 Extreme right
 Gremium Mc
 Hooligan
 Outlaw motorcycle club
 White power skinhead

References

External links 
 Troisième Voie website
 Le Local, his bar
 Interview with Serge Ayoub, Radio Bandiera Nera in May 2008.
 Radio Résistance, dernière interview de Serge Ayoub en date du 17 décembre 2008.

1964 births
French neo-Nazis
Living people
French activists
French people of Lebanese descent
National Rally (France) politicians
21st-century French politicians